The Churchill Professorship of Mathematics for Operational Research is a professorship in operational research at the University of Cambridge. It was established in 1966 by a benefaction from Esso  in memory of Sir Winston Churchill, who died the previous year. This was the second professorship established within the Cambridge Statistical Laboratory (the first being the Professorship of Mathematical Statistics).

List of Churchill Professors 

 1967–1994 Peter Whittle
 1994–2017 Richard Weber
 2020–     Ioannis Kontoyiannis

References

Mathematics for Operational Research, Churchill
Faculty of Mathematics, University of Cambridge
1966 establishments in the United Kingdom
Mathematics for Operational Research, Churchill
Mathematics education in the United Kingdom